Abdullah Nasser (Arabic:عبد الله ناصر; born 15 August 1992) is an Emirati footballer. He currently plays for Al-Taawon as a defender.

References

External links
 

Emirati footballers
1992 births
Living people
Fujairah FC players
Al Jazira Club players
Al-Wasl F.C. players
Dibba FC players
Dibba Al-Hisn Sports Club players
Al-Taawon (UAE) Club players
UAE First Division League players
UAE Pro League players
Association football defenders